Ival Oru Naadody is a 1979 Indian Malayalam-language film directed by P. Gopikumar. The film stars Jayabharathi, Sukumaran, Raghavan and Bhavani. The film has musical score by S. D. Sekhar.

Plot

Cast

Jayabharathi
Sukumaran
Raghavan
Bhavani
K. P. A. C. Azeez
Bobby Kottarakkara
K. P. Ummer
Kuthiravattam Pappu
Mala Aravindan
P. R. Varalekshmi
Zeenath
Baby Sonia
Vincent
 R. Balakrishna Pillai

Soundtrack
The music was composed by S. D. Sekhar and the lyrics were written by Dr. Shajahan.

References

External links
 

1979 films
1970s Malayalam-language films
Films shot in Kollam
Films directed by P. Gopikumar